This is a list of supermarket chains in Mongolia.

Supermarkets 

Mongolia
Lists of companies of Mongolia